Norm "Gus" Gustavsen (born September 8, 1927) is a Canadian former professional hockey player who played for the Tacoma Rockets and Vancouver Canucks in the Pacific Coast Hockey League, Syracuse Warriors in the American Hockey League, Charlottetown Islanders in the Maritime Major Hockey League (serving as captain), and Philadelphia Ramblers in the Eastern Hockey League.

External links
 

1927 births
Living people
Sportspeople from Timmins
Ice hockey people from Ontario
Tacoma Rockets players
Vancouver Canucks (WHL) players
Syracuse Warriors players
Charlottetown Islanders players
Philadelphia Ramblers players
Canadian ice hockey defencemen
20th-century Canadian people